The Port Theatre Art and Culture Center  is a historic site in Port St. Joe, Florida, located at 314 Reid Avenue. On June 5, 2003, it was added to the U.S. National Register of Historic Places.

References

External links
https://www.historicporttheatre.com/

 Gulf County listings at National Register of Historic Places
 Gulf County listings at Florida's Office of Cultural and Historical Programs

Buildings and structures in Gulf County, Florida
Theatres on the National Register of Historic Places in Florida
National Register of Historic Places in Gulf County, Florida